Hubert Trzybinski (born 26 April 1991 in Berlin) is a German rower. He won the single scull World U23 Championships in 2011 and 2013.

External links
 

1991 births
Living people
Rowers from Berlin
German male rowers
21st-century German people